Joseph Noriega Jr. (born May 31, 1788) was an American politician and brickyard owner who served as the first Alcade of Pensacola from 1820 to 1821. He later served in the Florida Territorial Council and in the Pensacola Board of Alderman.

Career 
Noriega served in the Louisiana Infantry Regiment, though he had retired from active duty by 1818. In 1817, it was noted that at several times after retirement, he had been employed by the Crown “with no salary or compensation whatsoever.” He eventually became the owner of an extensive brickyard in Escambia Bay.

In 1820, Noriega was elected as the first Alcade of Pensacola, and served in that position until 1821. He later served in the Legislative Council of the Territory of Florida and as an Alderman on the Board of Alderman of Pensacola from 1825 to 1827.

Personal life 
Joseph Noriega was born on May 31, 1788 in Louisiana to Victoria Lesassier Noriega de Alba and Joseph Noriega, Sr., a lieutenant colonel in the Louisiana Infantry Regiment. Noriega married Amelia Christin at St. Michael’s parish in Pensacola in  1816.

Joseph Noriega died on July 10, 1827 and was buried in St. Michael's Cemetery in Pensacola.

References 

Mayors of Pensacola, Florida
1788 births
1827 deaths